Blues Singer is the 12th studio album by Buddy Guy released in 2003 through Silvertone Records.

The album is all acoustic and dedicated to John Lee Hooker with the line, "In Memory of John Lee Hooker. You are missed."

Reception

Billboard noted...

The album was produced by Dennis Herring, at Sweet Tea Recording Studio in Oxford, Mississippi.

Awards
The album earned Guy the 2004 Grammy Award for Best Traditional Blues Album.

Track listing

Personnel

Musicians
 Buddy Guy – guitar, vocals
 Jimbo Mathus - guitar
 Jim Keltner - Drums
 Tony Garnier - Upright Bass
 Eric Clapton - Lead Guitar on tracks 2, 3
 B.B. King - Lead Guitar on track 2
 The Perrys - Snaps and Handclaps

Production
 Dennis Herring – producer

References 

2003 albums
Buddy Guy albums
Grammy Award for Best Traditional Blues Album